Manoranjan Debbarma (Born 5 October 1962) is an Indian politician and member of the Communist Party of India (Marxist).  He represented Mandaibazar (Vidhan Sabha constituency) of West Tripura district. Debbarma was a member of the Tripura Legislative Assembly from 1998 to 2018.

See also
 Rashiram Debbarma
 Radhacharan Debbarma
 Jitendra Choudhury

References 

Communist Party of India (Marxist) politicians
Living people
Communist Party of India (Marxist) politicians from Tripura
Tripura politicians
1962 births
People from West Tripura district